Jon Thiel (born May 31, 1975 in White Rock, British Columbia) is a Canadian rugby union footballer. He plays prop.

He has played in 3 Rugby World Cups for Canada. He has also played professionally for Sale Sharks, RC Narbonne, Bridgend RFC, and Llanelli RFC. Two of his sons, Josh and Jake, have both played Rugby for Canada.

External links
RWC Bio
Canadian prop Jon Thiel survives heart problem to make third World Cup

1975 births
Living people
Canadian rugby union players
Sportspeople from British Columbia
People from White Rock, British Columbia
Canada international rugby union players
Rugby union props